Garcia Live Volume Eight is a two-disc live album by the Jerry Garcia Band. It was recorded on November 23, 1991, at the Bradley Center in Milwaukee, Wisconsin. It was released on March 10, 2017.

From February 1986 to November 1993, the lineup of the Jerry Garcia Band was Jerry Garcia (guitar, lead vocals), Melvin Seals (keyboards), John Kahn (bass), David Kemper (drums), Jaclyn LaBranch (backing vocals), and Gloria Jones (backing vocals).

Critical reception
On AllMusic, Timothy Monger said, "The archival series Garcia Live offers up its eighth volume, this time highlighting a November 28, 1991 Jerry Garcia Band show at Milwaukee's Bradley Center, recorded during what is considered by many to be one of the band's finest tours. Wisconsinites at this show endured a massive snowstorm in order to hear [the band] blow through a breezy and spirited set of songs like "Cats Under the Stars", "My Sisters and Brothers", and a rousing take on the Manhattans' R&B classic "Shining Star"."

On Grateful Web, Dylan Muhlberg wrote: "1991 was a massive touring year for Garcia, who played one hundred and twelve shows total, including Grateful Dead, Garcia Band, and with David Grisman. Thirty-seven of those shows were with the Jerry Garcia Band, whose tight formation was intact since 1984.... By the time November 23rd rolled around, the Garcia Band had been on a hot tour... While much of Garcia Band's repertoire was covers, they were always heartfelt soulful arrangements. That night in Milwaukee, which was certainly Deadhead country, the band performed four originals penned by Robert Hunter."

Track listing
Disc 1
First set:
"Cats Under the Stars" (Jerry Garcia, Robert Hunter) – 9:44
"They Love Each Other" (Garcia, Hunter) – 8:39
"Lay Down Sally" (Eric Clapton, Marcy Levy, George Terry) – 8:47
"The Night They Drove Old Dixie Down" (Robbie Robertson) – 10:46
"Reuben and Cherise" (Garcia, Hunter) – 8:41
"Money Honey" (Jesse Stone) – 6:44
"My Sisters and Brothers" (Charles Johnson) – 4:02
"Deal" (Garcia, Hunter) – 8:06
Disc 2
Second set:
"Bright Side of the Road" (Van Morrison) – 5:57
"Waiting for a Miracle" (Bruce Cockburn) – 6:23
"Think" (Jimmy McCracklin, Deadric Malone) – 7:48
"Shining Star" (Paul Richmond, Leo Graham) – 13:22
"Ain't No Bread in the Breadbox" (Norton Buffalo) – 9:34
"That Lucky Old Sun" (Haven Gillespie, Beasley Smith) – 12:03
"Tangled Up in Blue" (Bob Dylan) – 11:16

Personnel
Jerry Garcia Band
Jerry Garcia – guitar, vocals
Gloria Jones – vocals
John Kahn – bass
David Kemper – drums
Jaclyn LaBranch – vocals
Melvin Seals – keyboards
Production
Produced by Marc Allan, Kevin Monty
Original recordings produced by Jerry Garcia
Recording: John Cutler
Mastering: Fred Kevorkian
Curator: Kevin Monty
Project coordinator: Lauren Goetzinger
Art direction, design, illustration: Ryan Corey
Liner notes essay: Dean Budnick
Photos: Bob Minkin

Charts

References

Jerry Garcia Band live albums
2017 live albums
ATO Records live albums